The Santo Domingo Metro is a rapid transit system in Greater Santo Domingo. Serving the capital of the Dominican Republic, it is the most extensive metro system in the insular Caribbean and Central American region by length and number of stations. It began operation in 2008.

The Metro is a major part of the "National Master Plan" to improve transportation in Greater Santo Domingo and the rest of the nation. The first line was planned to relieve traffic congestion on the Máximo Gómez and Hermanas Mirabal Avenue thoroughfares, which connect Santo Domingo. The second line, which opened in April 2013, is meant to relieve the congestion along the Duarte-Kennedy-Centenario Corridor in the city from west to east. Before the second line's opening, 30,856,515 passengers had  ridden the Santo Domingo Metro in 2012. With both lines opened, ridership increased to 61,270,054 passengers in 2014.

Four more lines are planned to be constructed in the near future, for a total of six lines.

Overview
The first line was unofficially inaugurated on February 27, 2008. On December 22, 2008, non-commercial operation of the metro system began and provided free service to the public during the Christmas holiday season. The metro was closed on January 6, 2009 for final touches before it opened for commercial use on January 30, 2009.

Shortly after the inauguration of Line 1, presidential elections took place in the Dominican Republic. President Leonel Fernández stayed in power and promised to continue the expansion of the Metro across the Greater Santo Domingo. By mid-2009, construction of Line 2 had commenced and it opened on April 1, 2013. An approval for an expansion of the second line was issued January 2014, with construction beginning on April 1, 2014.

Approval and construction

Line 1
President Leonel Fernández proposed and started the construction of the first subway system in the Dominican Republic and the second in the Caribbean. The actual first phase of the overall "Master Plan" for the Metro took place once Fernandez had proposed the construction of the Juan Bosch Bridge. The bridge was built with support for two heavy rail lines on the deck that until the third line of the system gets built are being used for regular vehicle traffic. This phase took place under Fernandez's first administration and with very little public knowledge of the Master Plan.

The project was prompted by the need to reduce the continually-rising heavy road traffic congestion; the current disorganized and inefficient public transportation system; and air pollution, which severely affects the residents' productive time and the health. The system will complement other forms of public transportation such as OMSA (Metropolitan Office of Buses Services) buses, with the government estimating that around 100 feeder buses will be in service. 

The first line of the mass-transit system has sixteen stations: six elevated, ten underground. That is expected to bring relief to the city's current public transport system. Daily ridership is expected to be about 200,000 passengers once other lines or at least the feeder bus system is integrated. The first line opened for commercial service on January 30, 2009.

On September 23, 2007, President Fernández while on a trip to the East Coast of the United States announced that stations on the Santo Domingo Metro were not to be named by the streets that they intercepted but instead named to honor important historical people of the Dominican Republic. On February 25, 2008, during the final testing before the official inauguration of the line by President Fernández, Ing. Diandino Peña announced the official names for the stations.

Line 2
In the presidential elections that took place on May 16, 2008, President Fernández was re-elected for his second consecutive term. However, long before his re-election, companies that specialize in studying land composition had begun drilling holes specifically around the area at which Line 2 (along Avenida John F. Kennedy, a major throughway in the city that turns into Duarte Highway, connecting the city with Santiago) was being built.

Line 2 runs east–west under Avenida John F. Kennedy from the westernmost metropolitan stretch of the city to the eastern part of the city. The line would be underground in its entire  course and intersect Line 1 in the heart of the city. Line 2 will cost about twice as Line 1 to complete because of its length. The economic burden that it would place on the national budget caused the decision, which was officially announced in September 2009, to construct it in two phases.

The first phase will be from Los Alcarrizos to Puente de la 17, where it will cross the first line. A second phase will complete the line from Puente de la 17  to San Isidro, in the eastern portion of Santo Domingo Este. Images gathered in news sites and forums show that construction is more advanced than what the government initially wanted to inform the press. Ultimately, the project has been reduced to ensure the conclusion and operation of a second line by the end of the 2008-2012 presidential term. Line 2 will operate from a station at Avenida Gregorio Luperón to a station before Puente de la 17, at Avenida Francisco del Rosario Sánchez.

Line 2 opened on April 1, 2013. An approval for an expansion of the second line was issued January 2014, and construction began on April 1, 2014. The extension was completed and was officially opened on August 8, 2018.

Rolling stock

The French firm Alstom supplied a total of 19 Alstom Metropolis 9000 three-car trainsets (57 cars) from its factories in Belgium, France and Spain in a contract worth 92.5 million euros. The cars are almost identical to the 9000 series on the Barcelona Metro except for the livery. In January 2011, an order was announced for a further 15 Alstom trainsets for Line 2. In January 2023, an order was announced for the supply of a further 10 three-car Alstom Metropolis trainsets. Once delivered, the total number of trainsets in the fleet will be brought to 64. 

The first train was shipped from Barcelona in December 2007 and arrived on January 3, 2008. The standard gauge units have air-conditioning, CCTV, and passenger information and can accommodate 617 passengers per trainset. The trains initially consist of three cars, but all stations are being built to accommodate six-car trains in anticipation of expected future ridership demand. Seventeen trainsets will normally be in service, with two sets as spares.

Unlike many rapid transit systems, Santo Domingo Metro trains do not collect power from a third rail, as trainsets collect their power from an overhead line system.

Station locations

Boleto Viajero 

The Boleto Viajero is a reloadable contactless smart card used for electronic transit fare payment by riders of the Santo Domingo Metro.

The card can be acquired in a Santo Domingo Metro station for DOP$60 with a minimum reload of 5 rides (DOP$100). It is offered as an alternative to the single-use cardboard cards. Even though the cardboard cards have a lower initial cost (DOP$15), they cannot be reloaded and must be discarded after their use.

Although OPRET lists price amounts against number of rides (viajes), the card records its balance in DOP. A bonus is also provided for 10 or 20 ride reloads.

As identification is not required to purchase the card, and Boleto Viajero cards cannot be registered, OPRET does not refund users in the event of loss or damage. Likewise, the card must be reloaded in person at a ticket vending booth, as OPRET does not offer Internet or phone-based top-up services. Automatic top-ups are also not available.

The Boleto Viajero cards are based on NXP MIFARE Classic chips and can be read by any ISO/IEC 14443 Type A reader. The single-use cardboard cards as of 2022 use NXP MIFARE Ultralight. However, only the card's manufacturer information (sector 0) is readable by the general public, as all of the remaining blocks are encrypted by using an unknown key.

Network map

See also
 Santiago Light Rail (planned)
 Rail transport in the Dominican Republic
 List of Latin American rail transit systems by ridership
 List of metro systems

References

External links

 Mashup Subway of Santo Domingo 
 Android App of the Subway of Santo Domingo 
 OPRET – official site 
 Metro de Santo Domingo 

 
2008 establishments in the Dominican Republic
Railway lines opened in 2008